Emaan is a 2011 Afghan action romance Drama film directed and produced by Haris Yosufi and starring Rasool Emaan, Tamana Amini and Ghafar Qutbyar. After much await and public demand, Emaan film was finally screened at Reading Cinemas in Australia. This is the first time an Afghan Film to be screened at a Cinema. Emaan - the winner of 2011 South Asian Film Festival (Canberra Australia) for Best Story and Best Film, where films like '3 Idiots' of India was also nominated and shown. The film's director and Producer Haris Yosufi resident of Australia he travelled to Afghanistan and spent six months shooting his film. He spent a further Five months in Australia for the post-production work. the film was released on 27 February 2011 in Afghanistan.

Plot
The film is based around the life of Emaan, a young, honest policeman who doesn't mind bending the rules to uphold justice. The story begins with the police investigating the rape and murder of a girl and soon after arresting the culprit. Emaans character, played by Rasool Emaan, is portrayed by the first sequence as a lonely, hardened man.

The lonely Emaan meets and instantly takes a liking to a young woman who has been married against her wishes to an older man, who then deserted her along with their small daughter.

Cast
 Rasool Emaan as Emaan
 Tamana Amini as Freshta
 Ghafar Qutbayar as Parwez Khan
 Roientan Enkesar as Afzali
 Abida Frotan as Mom
 Basir Tahiri as Haji Samey

Music
The film music was composed by Mohib Hamidi and Ahmad Fanoos.

See also
Cinema of Afghanistan

External links
 

2011 films
2010s action comedy-drama films
2011 romantic comedy-drama films
Dari-language films
Films set in Afghanistan
Films shot in Afghanistan
Afghan comedy films
Afghan drama films
2011 comedy films
2011 drama films